Oenopota obsoleta is a species of sea snail, a marine gastropod mollusk in the family Mangeliidae.

Distribution
This marine species occurs off Sakhalin, Eastern Russia

References

 Golikov, A. N., and O. A. Scarlato. "Shell-bearing gastropod and bivalve molluscs of the shelf of southern Sakhalin and their ecology." Biocenoses and fauna of the shelf of south Sakhalin. Issledovaniya Fauny Morei 30.38 (1985): 360–487.

External links
  Tucker, J.K. 2004 Catalog of recent and fossil turrids (Mollusca: Gastropoda). Zootaxa 682:1-1295.

obsoleta
Gastropods described in 1985